The Marca Geronis (march of Gero) was a vast super-march in the middle of the tenth century. It was created probably for Thietmar (in the 920s) and passed to his two sons consecutively: Siegfried and Gero. On Gero's death in 965 it was divided into five (sometimes counted as six) different marches: the Nordmark, the Ostmark, Meissen, Zeitz, and Merseburg.

Because Siegfried's and Gero's comital seat was Merseburg, it has sometimes been called the March of Merseburg. However, there is also a Merseburger march which grew out of it after 965. Because the central diocese in his march was Magdeburg, sometimes it is called the March of Magdeburg (Magdeburger Mark). Other historians prefer to call it the (Saxon) Eastern March or Ostmark, but these terms are also applied to another march which grew out of it in 965. Because the Marca Geronis was created simultaneously with the March of Billung to the north, it is sometimes said to be the southern half of the Ostmark. Some historians even call it the "March of Meissen." Within the span of one page, James Westfall Thompson, referred to it as both the "Sorben Mark" and the "Thuringian March."

Part of the complication involved in ascertaining the territoriality of the march over which Gero ruled is the nature of the margravial title in tenth-century Saxony. It may have signified territorial governance, but on the other hand may have been an honorific for especially powerful counts signifying nothing more than a preeminence in providing defence of the provinces in which were found their counties. It has been suggested that marcher jurisdictions even overlapped within provinces. 

In 965, Merseburg became the centre of a smaller, more restricted march belonging to Gunther. On Gunther's death in 982, it was united to the March of Meissen.

Notes

Sources
 Reuter, Timothy. Germany in the Early Middle Ages 800–1056. New York: Longman, 1991.
 Thompson, James Westfall. Feudal Germany, Volume II. New York: Frederick Ungar Publishing Co., 1928.
 Leyser, Karl. "Ottonian Government." The English Historical Review, Vol. 96, No. 381. (Oct., 1981), pp 721–753.
 Leyser, Karl. "Henry I and the Beginnings of the Saxon Empire." The English Historical Review, Vol. 83, No. 326. (Jan., 1968), pp 1–32.
 Lang, Henry Joseph. "The Fall of the Monarchy of Mieszko II, Lambert." Speculum, Vol. 49, No. 4. (Oct., 1974), pp 623–639.
 Dvornik, F. "The First Wave of the Drang Nach Osten." Cambridge Historical Journal, Vol. 7, No. 3. (1943), pp 129–145.
 Jakubowska, Bogna. "Salve Me Ex Ore Leonis." Artibus et Historiae, Vol. 12, No. 23. (1991), pp. 53–65.
 Howorth, H. H. "The Spread of the Slaves. Part III. The Northern Serbs or Sorabians and the Obodriti." The Journal of the Anthropological Institute of Great Britain and Ireland, Vol. 9. (1880), pp 181–232.

982 disestablishments
Geronis
History of Saxony-Anhalt
History of Magdeburg
Merseburg
920s establishments
10th century in East Francia

ru:Саксонская Восточная марка